Kęstutis Bulota (23 October 1896 – 1941) was a Lithuanian multi-sport athlete who participated in the 1928 Winter Olympics in speed skating. In 1922 and 1923 he played for the LFLS Kaunas football club. He was the Lithuanian champion in multiple sports, including holding national records in racewalking, the triple jump, and relay sprinting.

In 1928, Bulota become Lithuania's first winter Olympian. His best result was fifth place in the 10,000 metres race, which was ultimately abandoned due to thawing ice. On 14 June 1941, Bulota was deported to Siberia by Soviet authorities. He died there, while trying to escape from one of the Gulag labour camps when he was shot by security officers.

References

External links
 Bulota profile in LSE
 
 

1896 births
1941 deaths
Lithuanian footballers
Lithuanian ice hockey players
Lithuanian male racewalkers
Lithuanian male speed skaters
Lithuanian male triple jumpers
Olympic speed skaters of Lithuania
Speed skaters at the 1928 Winter Olympics
Association footballers not categorized by position
People who died in the Gulag
Lithuanian people executed by the Soviet Union
People executed by the Soviet Union by firearm